This list of the tallest buildings and structures in Croydon ranks buildings and structures in the London Borough of Croydon, England by height. The borough of Croydon, a local government district of Greater London, has a population of 330,587. At its core is Croydon, a former market town, with interests in producing charcoal, tanned leather, and brewing.

Most of the town's tallest buildings are office blocks constructed during the mid-20th century. However, since then many of these office blocks have become outdated, prompting a huge redevelopment programme for the town centre, called Croydon Vision 2020. The town has since witnessed a boom in the construction of high rise apartments, such as IYLO and Altitude 25, a former brownfield site. In contrast to the vast majority of London's tallest buildings, Croydon's high-rises were constructed in the 1960s and 70s as part of a project to create the South of England's largest office space outside of Central London. Some of the early high-rise buildings have subsequently been demolished themselves, such as Wettern House to allow for new skyscrapers to be constructed.

The list includes the year of completion for completed buildings, the height in metres and feet, and the current usage of the building. Similar to cities across the globe, Croydon's tallest structures are mostly concentrated in a central business district, which has added to the fact that many tourists enjoy Croydon because it is compact, especially those from far eastern countries including Japan. The tallest building in Croydon was No. 1 Croydon (formerly the NLA Tower), a high-rise office block, which was completed in 1970, until 2009, when Altitude 25, a residential high-rise complex, was completed. Saffron Square became the tallest building in Croydon in 2016 at 134 metres tall, but was overtaken by 101 George Street, the current tallest building in Croydon, which topped out in 2019 at 135.6 metres, and is also the world's tallest modular building. This in turn is expected to be surpassed by the 228 metre tall One Landsdowne Road that has been approved for construction by the current Mayor of London, Sadiq Khan. 

In December 2022, Croydon Council was warned in a meeting of Council officers and planning officials that Croydon was not Manhattan and that the suburb should not resemble New York City in a row over a new skyscraper development.

Tallest completed buildings

The tallest completed buildings above .

Tallest structures
The two tallest structures, as of the beginning of 2008, in Croydon are listed below. Structures which have been demolished are not included. A structure differs from a high-rise by its lack of floors and habitability.

Tallest under construction, approved, and proposed buildings

Approved

Proposed

Timeline of tallest buildings and structures

Croydon's skyline has been built up mostly since the mid-20th century. No. 1 Croydon held the title of tallest structure in Croydon for 38 years until Altitude 25 is built. This was replaced in 2016 by Saffron Square, a 2016 Carbuncle Cup-nominated high-rise completed as part of Croydon Vision 2020. Other high-rise buildings proposed to be built under the programme include the taller Morello Tower (171m) and One Landsdowne Road (228m).

See also

List of tallest structures in the United Kingdom
List of tallest buildings and structures in London

References

External links
Emporis — Croydon

Croydon

Croydon